State Board of Technical Education, Bihar is a governing body for polytechnic institutes in Bihar state of India. It is constituted under department of science and technology, Government of Bihar for the purpose of examination and certification of six semester or three years diploma courses in Polytechnic institutions.

History 
The board was constituted by Bihar government order number 75/Dir dated 31 May 1955 under the Department of Science & Technology, Government of Bihar.

Affiliated Institutes 
All 46 Government Polytechnics and 24 private institutes offering diploma course in engineering of Bihar are affiliated to the board.

AFFILIATED INSTITUTE LIST(Government)

 Govt. Polytechnic, Barauni
 Govt. Polytechnic, Bhagalpur
 Govt. Polytechnic, Chapra
 Govt. Polytechnic, Darbhanga

References

External links 

 
 Result publishing website

Qualifications awarding bodies
Educational organisations based in India